The 1994–95 Ottawa Senators season was the third season of the National Hockey League (NHL) club, was cut short due to the NHL lockout, which postponed the start of the season until late January, and teams only played 48 games that season. This was also the team's final full season at the Ottawa Civic Centre before moving to the Palladium the following season.

Regular season
Alexei Yashin once again proved to be the Senators leader on the ice, scoring 21 goals, along with 23 assists for a team leading 44 points. Alexandre Daigle had another strong season also, putting up 37 points (16 goals, 21 assists) to finish second to Yashin in team scoring.

Don Beaupre led the team in net, setting the team record for best GAA average in a season (3.36), best save percentage (.896), won 8 of the 9 games the Senators won during the season and got the first shutout in team history on February 6, when the Senators shutout the Philadelphia Flyers 3–0 at the Civic Centre.

The Sens started slow, going 0–6–2 in their first eight games before their shutout win over Philadelphia. They slumped throughout the first 41 games of the season, as they had a 4–32–5 record but the team finished the year by going 5–2–0 in their last seven games, outscoring their opponents 27-21, to finish the season with a 9–34–5 record but failed to avoid finishing in last place in the NHL for the third straight season.

The Senators finished last in wins (9), losses (34), points (23), even-strength goals against (129), and tied the Florida Panthers and Montreal Canadiens for fewest short-handed goals scored (1).

Season standings

Schedule and results

Player statistics

Regular season
Scoring

Goaltending

Awards and records
 Molson Cup - Don Beaupre

Transactions

Trades

Waivers

Source:

Free agents

Draft picks
Ottawa's draft picks at the 1994 NHL Entry Draft in Hartford, Connecticut.

Farm teams
 Prince Edward Island Senators (American Hockey League)
 Thunder Bay Senators (Colonial Hockey League)

See also
1994–95 NHL season

References

 
Ottawa Senators Media Guide 2007
The Internet Hockey Database
National Hockey League Guide & Record Book 2007

Ottawa Senators seasons
Ottawa Senators season, 1994-95
Ottawa